The 1984 NBL Finals was the postseason tournament of the National Basketball League's 1984 season, which began in February. The finals began on 22 June. The tournament concluded with the Canberra Cannons defeating the Brisbane Bullets in the NBL Grand Final on 1 July.

Format
The NBL finals series in 1984 consisted of the divisional finals, two semi-final games, and one championship-deciding grand final. The finals were contested between the top four teams of the regular season in each division, with the final four weekend split between the AIS Arena and The Glass House.

Qualification

Qualified teams

Ladder

The NBL tie-breaker system as outlined in the NBL Rules and Regulations states that in the case of an identical win–loss record, the results in games played between the teams will determine order of seeding.

Playoffs bracket

The top four teams in each division competed in a 1v2/3v4 elimination finals fixture between 22 June and 23 June, with the loser of 1v2 playing the winner of 3v4 for a spot in the Semi-finals, while the winner of 1v2 qualified through to the Semi-finals as well. The result2 were as follows:

Divisional Finals

Western

(2) Canberra Cannons vs (1) Geelong Cats

(4) Nunawading Spectres vs (3) Adelaide 36ers

(1) Geelong Cats vs (4) Nunawading Spectres

Eastern

(1) Brisbane Bullets vs (2) Coburg Giants

(3) Newcastle Falcons vs (4) Illawarra Hawks

(3) Newcastle Falcons vs (2) Coburg Giants

Semi-finals

(2) Canberra Cannons vs (2) Coburg Giants

(1) Geelong Cats vs (1) Brisbane Bullets

Grand Final

(1) Brisbane Bullets vs (2) Canberra Cannons

See also
 1984 NBL season

References

Finals
National Basketball League (Australia) Finals